The 1990 Vrancea earthquakes were three earthquakes on 30 and 31 May 1990 with magnitudes of 7.0  and 6.2  that struck the Romanian county of Vrancea, on two consecutive days. Severe damage in the Bucharest-Brăila-Brașov area was reported and dozens of casualties in Romania and neighbouring Moldova, Ukraine and Bulgaria.

The seismic doublet of May 1990 consisted of two mainshocks occurred at a distance of only 13 hours. The first mainshock took place in the afternoon of 30 May 1990, at 13:40:06 (local hour). The epicenter was located in the northeastern part of the Vrancea Mountains, at a depth of 89 km. The earthquake had a magnitude of  6.7 or  6.9, the intensity in the epicentral area being of VIII degrees on the Mercalli intensity scale, and VII degrees in Bucharest. On the morning of 31 May 1990, at 3:17 (local hour), occurred the second mainshock, at a depth of 79–86 km, having the magnitude  6.1 or  6.3. The event was felt in the epicentral area with an intensity of VII degrees on the Mercalli intensity scale, and VI degrees in Bucharest; likewise, the quake was felt strong enough in Dobruja.

In the USGS EXPO-CAT database it is estimated that during this earthquake 355,000 people were exposed to intensity VII, of which around 61% were in rural areas.

Aftershocks 
The first mainshock was followed by several aftershocks with magnitudes ranging between 3–4.5 degrees on the Richter scale, reported in the afternoon and evening of 30 May.

On the morning of 31 May 1990 continued the replicas of the two mainshocks. Thus, at 7:48 (local hour) occurred a replica of magnitude 4.7, felt in Bucharest with an intensity of IV degrees on the Mercalli intensity scale. Other replicas of lower magnitudes continued to occur in Vrancea until the end of June 1990, in the depth floor of 70–90 km. Secondary seismic movements, at the same depth, were recorded and later, until October 1990.

Damage 
Economic losses have been reported by Munich Re to be in the region of 30 million US$. In Moldova, the earthquake caused damage to property worth 100 million rubles.

Casualties 
According to data from the General Inspectorate of Police, the earthquake killed nine people. Two of the deaths occurred in Bucharest in the district of Colentina, when the heavy plasterboard of an 11-storey apartment block collapsed along the expansion joint, due to pounding between the two separate parts of the structure. Were injured in total 362 persons, including 100 severely, namely: Bucharest 35, Bacău 14, Brașov 3, Brăila 11, Dolj 1, Galați 12, Ialomița 4, Prahova 14, Vaslui 1, Vrancea 2. Were slightly injured 262 people, of which 103 in Bucharest, 16 in Bacău, 14 in Brașov, 47 in Brăila, 7 in Covasna, 20 in Dolj, 10 in Galați, 8 in Ialomița, 20 in Prahova, 1 in Vrancea. The injuries and deaths were a result of falling chimneys, pieces of construction materials from the upper floors of buildings.

In Moldovan SSR, four people died and dozens were injured, and in northern Bulgaria, one person died of a heart attack.

See also 
 List of earthquakes in 1990
 List of earthquakes in Romania
 List of earthquakes in Bulgaria

References

Sources

External links 
 

1990 earthquakes
May 1990 events in Romania
1990 in Bulgaria
1990 in the Moldavian Soviet Socialist Republic
1990 in Ukraine
1990 in the Soviet Union
Earthquakes in Romania
Earthquakes in Bulgaria
Earthquakes in Moldova
Earthquakes in Ukraine
Earthquakes in the Soviet Union
May 1990 events in Europe
1990 disasters in the Soviet Union
1990 disasters in Europe
1990 disasters in Bulgaria
1990 disasters in Ukraine